David Beaty may refer to:

 David Beaty (businessman) (1811–1889), American who discovered oil at his home in Warren, Pennsylvania
 David Beaty (author) (1911–1999), British writer, pilot and psychologist
 David Beaty (American football) (born 1970), American football coach

See also
 David Beatty (disambiguation)